Heritage Day may refer to:

 Heritage Day (Alberta), a holiday in Alberta, Canada
 Nova Scotia Heritage Day, a holiday in Nova Scotia, Canada
 Yukon Heritage Day, a holiday in Yukon, Canada
 China's Cultural Heritage Day, a holiday in China
 European Heritage Days, a holiday in various locations in Europe
 Finnish Swedish Heritage Day, a flag day in Finland
 Heritage Day (South Africa), a holiday in South Africa
 Native American Heritage Day, a holiday in the United States
 Heritage Day, a holiday in Easton, Pennsylvania, United States
 Heritage Open Days, a weekend in the United Kingdom